Tallcree 173A, also known as North Tallcree, is an Indian reserve of the Tallcree First Nation in Alberta, located within Mackenzie County. It is 40 kilometres southeast of Fort Vermilion. In the 2016 Canadian Census, it recorded a population of 224 living in 55 of its 58 total private dwellings.

References

Indian reserves in Alberta